The Norwegian National Academy of Opera was established in 1964 as a two-year education in opera. The school was given collegiate status in 1982.

In 1996 the National Academy of Opera became part of Oslo National Academy of the Arts (Kunsthøgskolen i Oslo, KHiO).

External links
Oslo National Academy of the Arts

Opera
Opera
Educational institutions established in 1964
Educational institutions disestablished in 1996
1964 establishments in Norway